"Right Here, Right Now" is a song recorded by Italian producer Giorgio Moroder, featuring the vocals of Kylie Minogue, for Moroder's studio album Déjà Vu. The song had a minor impact on singles chart in Europe and attained the top position of the US Dance Club Songs.

Composition
"Right Here, Right Now" is a dance club song that is a disco track that is influenced by funk and electronic music.

Background
"Right Here, Right Now" is served as the second single from Giorgio Moroder's studio album Déjà Vu. Recorded in 2014, it features guest vocals from Kylie Minogue. The song was leaked on 16 January 2015 and subsequently released digitally on 20 January. "Right Here, Right Now" was produced by Moroder and Patrick Jordan-Patrikios, and written by Moroder, Patrick Jordan-Patrikios, Karen Poole and David Etherington. The song was mixed by Mitch McCarthy at Owl Foot Ranch in Los Angeles, California.

Announced in November, Déjà Vu features contributions from artists such as Minogue, Britney Spears, Sia, Charli XCX, Mikky Ekko, Foxes and Matthew Koma. Moroder's forthcoming album is his first studio release in over 30 years.

Kylie Minogue has previously recorded a different song with the same name; her fourth studio album Let's Get to It (1991) featured a song called "Right Here, Right Now".

Reception
"Right Here, Right Now" has largely accrued positive reviews from critics. Billboard magazine described the "pulsating pop/dance track" as part of a "renaissance" of Giorgio Moroder. Many media outlets opined that the song was a strong collaboration between Moroder and Minogue. Nolan Freeney of Time magazine stated that the collaboration worked well, noting that the song sounded like could have appeared on Minogue's last studio album Kiss Me Once (2014). Freeney said: "Thanks the track's deep vocoder-like hiccups, it's clear Moroder has no problem updating his sound after all these decades." Stefan Kyriazis of the Daily Express described Minogue as "the perfect partner in crime" to Moroder.

Music Times stated "The tune shows Moroder's ability to mold a track on which he is collaborating with. 'Right Here, Right Now' features the best of both artists, with Moroder's oscillating deep bass and disco stylings under a soulful performance from Minogue that could have been delivered 40 years prior as she croons a stunning vocal performance from start to finish." Chris Coplan of Consequence of Sound described Minogue's vocals as "seductive". Coplan stated and the Moroder was expert at creating a song "around a vocalist and their persona", noting his past work with Donna Summer, and that "Right Here, Right Now" exhibited this with Minogue.

Commercial performance
"Right Here, Right Now" had limited commercial success. In the United Kingdom, it failed to enter the UK Singles Chart as it includes streaming data since July 2014, peaking instead at number 125. The song also debuted and peaked at number 74 on the UK Singles Sales Chart on the week of February 1, 2015. It slipped to number 79 before dropping out of the chart.

Elsewhere in Europe, "Right Here, Right Now" spent a sole week on the French and Spanish peaking at number 147, and 40 respectively. In Belgium, the song failed to make an appearance on the Ultratop singles chart as it peaked on the Flanders and Wallonia Ultratip charts at number 10 and 28 respectively.

In the United States, "Right Here, Right Now" debuted at number 35 on the Billboard Hot Dance Club Songs on the issue of 7 March 2015, and reached number one in its 18 April 2015 issue giving Moroder's first and Minogue's twelfth chart-topper on the Hot Dance Club Songs.

Live performances
"Right Here Right Now" was performed on Minogue's Australian leg of her Kiss Me Once Tour with Moroder. It was part of the "Secret Kiss" segment. Donna Summer's "I Feel Love" was also performed as a cover by Minogue with Moroder.

Music video
Directed by Daniel Börjesson, the music video was filmed in December 2014. Blake McGrath choreographed the filming. In January 2015, a fifteen-second teaser clip was uploaded on YouTube and in February, the entire music video was uploaded to Giorgio Moroder's Vevo account. The video currently has 6.8 million views on Moroder's official YouTube channel.

Cover version
In October 2020, a Japanese singer Yū Hayami recorded the cover of "Right Here, Right Now" for the compilation album, Slenderie Ideal.

Track listing
Digital download
"Right Here, Right Now"  – 3:30

Remixes – EP
"Right Here, Right Now"  – 3:30
"Right Here, Right Now"  – 5:43
"Right Here, Right Now"  – 5:27
"Right Here, Right Now"  – 5:44
"Right Here, Right Now"  – 6:28

More Remixes – EP
"Right Here, Right Now"  – 6:43
"Right Here, Right Now"  – 3:59
"Right Here, Right Now"  – 4:38
"Right Here, Right Now"  – 4:33
"Right Here, Right Now"  – 8:14

Charts

Release history

See also
 List of number-one dance singles of 2015 (U.S.)

References

2015 singles
2014 songs
Kylie Minogue songs
Giorgio Moroder songs
RCA Records singles
Song recordings produced by Giorgio Moroder
Songs written by Giorgio Moroder
Songs written by Karen Poole